Soulaures is a commune in the Dordogne department in Nouvelle-Aquitaine in southwestern France.

Church of Saint-Martial built in the twelfth century. The small single nave church has a bell placed at the right wall of the triumphal arch

Population
The inhabitants of Soulaures are called Soulaurais.

Economy
As of December 31, 2013, the municipality had eleven establishments, eight of them in agriculture, forestry or fishing, one in construction, one in industry, and one in the administrative sector.

See also
Communes of the Dordogne département

References

Communes of Dordogne